Zouheir Hory (born 15 March 1966) is a Syrian wrestler. He competed in the men's Greco-Roman 68 kg at the 1988 Summer Olympics.

References

External links
 

1966 births
Living people
Syrian male sport wrestlers
Olympic wrestlers of Syria
Wrestlers at the 1988 Summer Olympics
Place of birth missing (living people)